Mauritzen is a surname. Notable people with the surname include:

 Barbara Mauritzen (1925–2011), British cryptographer
 Cecilie Mauritzen (born 1961), Norwegian oceanographer
 Sverre Mauritzen (born 1943), Norwegian diplomat and politician